C. leptochila may refer to:

 Caladenia leptochila, a spider orchid
 Canna leptochila, a garden plant
 Cryptostylis leptochila, a tongue orchid